Mihatovići is a village in the municipality of Tuzla, Tuzla Canton, Bosnia and Herzegovina.

It was a Bosnian war refugee settlement and home of 8,000 refugees, who were mainly Bosnian Muslims.

Demographics 
According to the 2013 census, its population was 1,353.

References

Populated places in Tuzla